Nowhere is the debut album by British shoegaze band Ride, released 15 October 1990. Rolling Stone called the album "a masterpiece", and online magazine Pitchfork called it "one of shoegazing's enduring moments".

Background and production 
Ride released three EPs, Ride, Play, and Fall, prior to the release of Nowhere. Nowhere was recorded live-in-the-studio with producer Marc Waterman. Waterman had a mental breakdown, which resulted in Alan Moulder mixing the recordings.

The band members were 18 or 19 during the recording of Nowhere. Mark Gardener described it as a "nighttime sort of record", and recalled the band working on the album in the studio during late-night hours, leading to feelings of isolation as a result of the irregular work schedule.

Artwork 
The album cover features an uncrested wave photographed by skateboard/snowboard photographer Warren Bolster. The original LP cover artwork had the band name in embossed text centered in the upper half and an embossed album title in the lower right corner. The original cassette and CD releases featured no band name or album title on the cover, but sometimes came with an identifying sticker on the outside of the CD or cassette case. For the 2001 CD re-release, the band name and title were printed visibly on the cover in the locations of the LP's embossed text. The 2011 Rhino Handmade edition features a lenticular design of the wave.

Release 
Nowhere was released by Creation Records on 15 October 1990. The album was issued in the United States in December 1990 by Sire Records, featuring three bonus tracks culled from the band's Fall EP.

A 2001 reissue by Ignition Records further added the four songs from the band's Today Forever EP as bonus tracks.

In February 2011, Rhino Handmade released a special 20th anniversary edition of Nowhere, featuring the remastered original album with seven bonus tracks, plus a bonus disc featuring a previously unreleased live performance at The Roxy in Los Angeles recorded on 10 April 1991. The set also includes a 40-page booklet with exclusive photos and a new essay by music critic Jim DeRogatis, as well as a lenticular-covered digipak book.

In November 2015, the band released a special 25th anniversary edition of Nowhere across two separate formats: a CD/DVD set, and a coloured-vinyl double LP. The CD features the same audio material as the 2001 and 2011 reissues remastered, with a DVD featuring a previously unreleased live performance at Town and Country Club in London on 7 March 1991. The discs come in a hardback cardboard case with canvas-style cover and a 36-page booklet. The 2LP version features an expanded track listing with 7 bonus tracks from the Fall and Today Forever EPs, and was pressed on white and blue marbled colour vinyl. The reissue was released independently. In conjunction with the re-release, the band performed the album in its entirety at a series of live shows in October 2015.

Nowhere was re-released in November 2022 by Wichita recordings. All the original audio reworked and refined, the reissue made available on vinyl and CD. It charted at number 62 on the UK Albums Chart.

Legacy 

AllMusic has cited Nowhere as one of the greatest albums of the shoegaze genre. Nowhere was ranked at number 74 on Pitchforks 2003 list of the top 100 albums of the 1990s, and at number 277 on Spins 2015 list of "The 300 Best Albums of the Past 30 Years". It is also included in the book 1001 Albums You Must Hear Before You Die. The track "Vapour Trail" was named the 145th best song of the 1990s by Pitchfork in 2010, and the 81st best song of the 1990s by NME in 2012.

Track listing 
All songs were equally credited to Ride (Andy Bell, Loz Colbert, Mark Gardener, Steve Queralt).

Personnel 
Ride
 Mark Gardener – vocals, guitar
 Andy Bell – vocals, guitar, piano, harmonica
 Steve Queralt – bass
 Loz Colbert – drums
Technical
 Marc Waterman – recording
Alan Moulder – mixing at Swanyard Studios, London
Nick Webb – remastering (Abbey Road Studios)
Joe Dilworth – band photography
Warren Bolster – wave photography

References 

Sources

External links 

Nowhere at YouTube (streamed copy where licensed)
Lyrics

Ride (band) albums
Creation Records albums
1990 debut albums